Karl Fredrik (Kaarlo Reetrikki) Kares (14 December 1873, in Nakkila – 23 March 1942; surname until 1876 Präski) was a Finnish Lutheran Vicar of Lapua and politician. He was a member of the Parliament of Finland, representing the Finnish Party from 1907 to 1910, the National Coalition Party from 1922 to 1927 and the Patriotic People's Movement (IKL) from 1933 until his death in 1942.

Views
Kares welcomed Nazi Germany and openly supported the views of the German Christian movement, the Nazi ecclesiastical cover organization. According to him, with the Nazis, "new refreshing winds were blowing in the German church".

Kares was also an anti-Semitic , claiming that the persecution of the Jews was due to their own actions. Kares considered the Jews as whole rich and lacking in God’s blessing. According to him, the antichrist was also a Jew.

References

1873 births
1942 deaths
People from Nakkila
People from Turku and Pori Province (Grand Duchy of Finland)
20th-century Finnish Lutheran clergy
Finnish Party politicians
National Coalition Party politicians
Patriotic People's Movement (Finland) politicians
Members of the Parliament of Finland (1907–08)
Members of the Parliament of Finland (1908–09)
Members of the Parliament of Finland (1909–10)
Members of the Parliament of Finland (1922–24)
Members of the Parliament of Finland (1924–27)
Members of the Parliament of Finland (1933–36)
Members of the Parliament of Finland (1936–39)
Members of the Parliament of Finland (1939–45)
University of Helsinki alumni
Finnish Nazis